Rulebreaker is the eleventh studio album from the German heavy metal band Primal Fear. The album was released on January 22, 2016. It is the first album to have Francesco Jovino on drums. It also marks the return of original guitarist, Tom Naumann, for his third stint with the band, making it the band’s first album with three guitar players.

Music videos were made for "Angels of Mercy" and "The End Is Near".

Track listing

Personnel 
Ralf Scheepers – vocals
Mat Sinner – bass, vocals
Magnus Karlsson – guitars, keyboards
Alex Beyrodt – guitars
Tom Naumann – guitars
Francesco Jovino – drums

References 

2016 albums
Frontiers Records albums
Primal Fear (band) albums